Eastern Europe, Caucasus and Central Asia (EECCA) is a block of countries that includes Armenia, Azerbaijan, Belarus, Georgia, Kazakhstan, Kyrgyzstan, Moldova, Russian Federation, Tajikistan, Turkmenistan, Ukraine and Uzbekistan.

External links 

 OECD Listing of EECCA countries

International relations